Robin Selvig (born August 21, 1952) is an American women's college basketball coach. Selvig completed his 38th and final season as head coach of the Lady Griz women's basketball team at the University of Montana, in 2015–16. Selvig finished his career ranked eighth among all women's basketball coaches in victories with 865.

Head coaching record 
Source:

Personal life
A native of Outlook, Montana, Selvig came from a family of eight children. Selvig graduated from the University of Montana in the spring of 1974 with a degree in health and physical education.   His brother, Doug, and sister, Sandy, were both University of Montana basketball letterwinners. Doug Selvig’s daughter Carly and son Derrick both played basketball at the University of Montana. Sandy's youngest daughter, Jordan Sullivan, also played for the Lady Griz under Rob's leadership with her cousin Carly. Sullivan is currently the assistant coach for the Lady Griz.

Robin Selvig and his wife, Janie, have two adult sons, and two grandkids.

Selvig has also served as the director of the Montana Special Olympics and as a spokesman for Missoula Youth Homes and is the chairman of the 2011 Missoula Heart Walk.

See also
List of college women's basketball coaches with 600 wins

References 

1952 births
Living people
American men's basketball players
American women's basketball coaches
Basketball players from Montana
People from Sheridan County, Montana
High school basketball coaches in the United States
Montana Grizzlies basketball players
Montana Lady Griz basketball coaches
Guards (basketball)